The 2021 Big South men's basketball tournament was the postseason men's basketball tournament that ended the 2020–21 NCAA Division I men's basketball season of the Big South Conference. It was held from February 27 through March 7, 2021 and all tournament games were played on home arenas of the higher-seeded school.  The tournament winner received the automatic bid to the NCAA tournament.

Seeds
All of the conference teams, except for Charleston Southern, competed in the tournament. Charleston Southern cancelled their season after going 3–18 due to contact tracing, so they did not compete in the conference tournament. The top six teams received a first-round bye. Teams were seeded by record within the conference, with a tiebreaker system to seed teams with identical conference records.

The tiebreakers operate in the following order:
 Head-to-head record.
 Record against the top-ranked conference team not involved in the tie, going down the standings until the tie is broken. For this purpose, teams with the same conference record are considered collectively. If two teams were unbeaten or winless against an opponent but did not play the same number of games against that opponent, the tie is not considered broken.

Schedule

Bracket

References

External links
2021 Big South Men's Basketball Championship

Tournament
Big South Conference men's basketball tournament
Big South Conference men's basketball tournament